South East Derbyshire may refer to:

South East Derbyshire (UK Parliament constituency)
South East Derbyshire Rural District, a rural district in Derbyshire, England from 1894 to 1974

See also
Derbyshire (disambiguation)